Pedro Díaz Lobato (born 31 May 1973) is a Spanish former road racing cyclist. Professional from 1999 to 2004, he notably won a stage of the 2003 Vuelta a España.

Major results
1999
 1st Stage 9 Vuelta a la Argentina
2001
 1st Stage 1 Vuelta a Andalucía
2003
 1st Stage 18 Vuelta a España
 1st Memorial Manuel Galera

Grand Tour general classification results timeline

References

External links

1973 births
Living people
Spanish male cyclists
Cyclists from Madrid
Spanish Vuelta a España stage winners